The Asatru Folk Assembly (AFA) is a white supremacist international Ásatrú organization, founded by Stephen A. McNallen in 1994. Many of the assembly's doctrines, heavily criticized by most heathens, are based on ethnicity, an approach it calls "folkish". Once headquartered in Grass Valley, California, with chapters worldwide, the AFA is recognized as a 501(c)(3) non-profit religious organization.

History
The AFA's roots are in the Viking Brotherhood, founded by McNallen in 1972. McNallen was one of the earliest advocates in the United States of reconstructing Germanic Paganism. The Viking Brotherhood evolved into the Asatru Free Assembly in 1974, and was disbanded in 1986, splitting into two successor organizations, the "folkish" Ásatrú Alliance, and the "universalist" Troth. In 1986, the Asatru Free Assembly ceased operations, due to burnout and disputes about polygamous relationships within the membership. According to accounts by McNallen, it was not due to racial politics, but because administration was time-consuming and the membership rejected a request seeking pay for religious work.

McNallen founded the Asatru Folk Assembly in 1995 as the successor organization to the Asatru Free Assembly. The defunct Asatru Free Assembly and Asatru Folk Assembly are sometimes called the "old AFA" and "new AFA", respectively. From 1997 to 2002, the AFA was a member of the International Asatru-Odinic Alliance.

McNallen believes in an "integral link between ancestry and religion, between biology and spirituality"; according to Jeffrey Kaplan, the organization was founded in part to counteract rumored "universalist" tendencies he discerned in Ring of Troth.

In 1999, the AFA almost acquired land in northern California, aiming to base a communal project with room for agriculture and religious worship. But it never held legal title to the land. Upon promises that the land would be donated, some AFA members built a simple hof there, after which the land's owner chose not to donate it. 

In the late 1990s, the AFA got involved in a protracted fight over the remains of the Kennewick Man:  members claimed that these were the remains of a European ancestor; they were allowed to approach, but not touch, the coffin holding the Kennewick Man. Later testing showed that Kennewick Man is "very closely related to the Colville" tribe in northeast Washington.

In May 2017, Facebook deleted the AFA's primary social media outlet, citing hate speech as the reason. In 2018, the Southern Poverty Law Center added the AFA to its list of hate groups as part of a new category called "neo-Völkisch". The Anti-Defamation League lists the AFA as an "extremist group".

In December 2019, two members of the Army National Guard received a general discharge after their involvement as leaders of "Ravensblood Kindred," an extremist group that shared ties with the AFA, were revealed. Both had previously attended a rally by Richard B. Spencer. One was on active duty in Afghanistan and one worked as a jailer for the Haralson County Sheriff's Office until the broadcast of their involvement, at which point the employment was terminated.

Activity
Since 2013, the AFA has owned rights to many of the books of "Edred Thorsson" (a pen name of Stephen Flowers).

In August 2015, the AFA acquired a former Grange Hall in Challenge–Brownsville, California, about 40 miles from Grass Valley, where the group was founded. The hall was built in 1938, and was purchased to be used as a hof and community center under the name Newgrange Hall Asatru Hof. It was previously the Youth Center of the Mountaintop Christian Academy of California, and at another time the Marge Moore Youth Center. This first hof has since been named Odinshof, in dedication to the god Odin.

In April 2020, the AFA acquired a former church in Linden, North Carolina, which has been turned into a heathen hof serving AFA members in the Southeastern United States. This second hof is named Thorshof, in dedication to the god Thor.

In June 2020, the AFA purchased a former Lutheran church in Murdock, Minnesota, to be used as gathering place for AFA members of the Northern Great Plains. In December 2020, the Murdock City Council gave the AFA conditional approval to use the church. More than 120,000 Minnesotans have signed a petition to stop the group's use of the building. This third hof is named Baldrshof, in dedication to the god Baldr.

In 2022, the AFA purchased a former church in White Springs, Florida, to serve as a hof for AFA members in the Southern United States. A monthly food pantry for the local community is operated by the AFA at this location. This fourth hof has been named Njordshof, in dedication to the god Njörðr.

Opposition  
As a result of the perceived discriminatory activities of the AFA, numerous Heathen and neo-pagan organizations sought to produce a document refuting these beliefs and the characterization that they represented these faiths. The product was Declaration 127, which specifically condemned the AFA. This declaration has been criticized for its specific focus on the AFA, and efforts taken to expand it. One alternative to Declaration 127 is the "Declaration of Deeds," a much wider-ranging statement against discrimination and hate in Heathenism.

See also 

 Far-right politics
 List of white nationalist organizations
 Neo-Völkisch movements

References

Notes

Bibliography

External links
 

1994 establishments in California
501(c)(3) organizations
Alt-right organizations
Ásatrú in the United States
Germanic neopagan organisations
European American culture in California
Non-profit organizations based in California
Religion in California
Modern pagan organizations established in 1994
Modern pagan organizations based in the United States
White nationalism in California